Aurora University (AU) is a private university in Aurora, Illinois. In addition to its main campus, AU offers programs online, at its George Williams College campus in Williams Bay, Wisconsin, and at the Woodstock Center in downtown Woodstock, Illinois. Approximately 6,200 students are enrolled in bachelor's, master's, and doctoral degree programs at Aurora University.

History
Aurora University was founded as Mendota Seminary in Mendota, Illinois, in 1893. At that time, the school was focused on education and training rooted in the Advent Christian Church. Within a few years of its founding, the seminary changed its name to Mendota College, and broadened its programs into a traditional liberal arts curriculum.

In 1911, residents of the nearby town of Aurora raised funds to construct a new college, led by funding from businessman Charles Eckhart, who founded the predecessor company to the Auburn Automobile Company. Recognizing mutual benefits, administrators of Mendota College moved their operations to Aurora and the school became known as Aurora College.

In 1971, Aurora College separated from the Advent Christian Church, and in 1985, changed its name to Aurora University to better reflect the breadth of its academic programs.

In 1992, the school entered into an affiliation agreement with George Williams College, in Williams Bay, Wisconsin, which was followed by a full merger in 2000. George Williams College (named for YMCA founder George Williams) had been instituted in 1886 by YMCA leaders to create a summer school where young men and women would gather for learning, fellowship and reflection. With the merger, the one-time summer school, camp and conference center now serves undergraduate students in a variety of degree programs. Over the past decade, the historic George Williams College campus has been transformed through renovations to new structures including the creation of the Winston Paul Educational Center, Oak and Hickory lodges, the Beasley Campus Center and the Ferro Pavilion, where the annual Music by the Lake outdoor concert series takes place during the summer months.In November 2022, Aurora University announced “plans to end academic programming at the campus in December 2023” and continue operations as a conference center and as the host of Music by the Lake.

Aurora University added a third location in 2009 with the opening of the Woodstock Center, which offers undergraduate transfer, graduate, and endorsement programs in evening and weekend formats. The center is located in Woodstock, Illinois, approximately 50 miles north of the university's main campus.

Today, Aurora University, the GWC campus, and the Woodstock Center are operated by the Board of Trustees of Aurora University and presided over by a chief executive officer. Each site has a team of senior administrators who report to the president.

Presidents
 J. Oscar Campbell - 1893
 A.W. Sibley - 1894
 C.V. Clum - 1895–1898
 M.L. Gordon - 1898–1901
 Nathan C. Twining - 1901–1906
 Bert J. Dean - 1906–1911
 Orrin Roe Jenks - 1911–1932
 Theodore Pierson Stephens - 1933–1962
 James E. Crimi - 1962–1973
 Lloyd M. Richardson - 1974–1978
 Alan J. Stone - 1978–1988
 Thomas Zarle - 1988–2000
 Rebecca L. Sherrick - 2000–2023

Academics
Aurora University offers 50 undergraduate majors and minors, a wide variety of master's degrees, several graduate certificates in education and social work, and online doctoral degrees in education and social work .

The university is composed of the following:
 The College of Education and Social Work includes the School of Education and George Williams School of Social Work.
 The College of Health and Sciences includes the School of Health Sciences, School of Nursing, and School of Natural Sciences, Technology, and Math.
 The College of Liberal Arts and Business includes the Dunham School of Business, School of Humanities, and School of Social and Behavioral Sciences. 

 Academics at George Williams College of Aurora University (GWC) offers offers undergraduate programs in business management, environmental students and sustainability, nursing, psychology, and social work. 
 The Woodstock Center, located in downtown Woodstock, offers evening and weekend programs for adults pursuing a bachelor’s or master’s degree in business, education, or social work. It also offers certificate and endorsement programs. 
 Aurora University Online offers undergraduate, graduate, and doctoral programs, as well as endorsements in a completely online format.
The university states that its student-faculty ratio is 20:1, and that the average class size is 25 students.

Aurora University operates on a semester-based academic year. The school also offers an international- and service-focused “Travel in May” program at the conclusion of the spring semester, as well as summer courses.

Accreditation
The Higher Learning Commission accredits Aurora University at the bachelor's, master's and doctoral levels.

Program-specific accreditations include:
 The baccalaureate nursing program is accredited by the Commission on Collegiate Nursing Education, while the master’s level entry to nursing practice degree program is pursuing accreditation.
 The athletic training program is accredited by the Commission on Accreditation of Athletic Training Education.
 The initial teacher licensure programs are accredited by the Illinois State Board of Education.
 The George Williams School of Social Work is accredited by the Council for Social Work Education.
 The Certified Alcohol and Drug Counselor training program is accredited by the Illinois Certification Board.

Campus
The Aurora campus is based primarily around a traditional quadrangle and adjacent areas. In total, the campus is approximately 32 acres. All buildings constructed by the university have red tile roofs (with the exception of two, which continue the red theme on exterior wall panels), a stipulation of Charles Eckhart in his initial donation in the early days of Aurora College.

Buildings include:
 Alumni Hall: Includes the primary student dining hall, the University Banquet Hall, Thornton Gymnasium, athletic training room, athletic offices and a weight room. In 2010, construction began on a new wing for Alumni Hall, which opened in 2011 to house several academic programs and classrooms primarily for athletic training, exercise science, nursing and social work programs.
 Centennial Hall: Houses freshmen and upper-class students in air-conditioned double rooms. The building is co-ed by floor with same-gender, community-style bathrooms located on each floor.
 Davis Hall and Memorial Hall: Originally built in 1912 to house male students, Davis Hall was renovated in 2004. Memorial Hall was built in 1955 as a women-only extension to Davis Hall, and was renovated in 2002. Both buildings are now co-educational residence halls.
 Don and Betty Tucker Hall: Built with universal design in mind to ensure all spaces are sensory friendly. Each floor is co-ed by room and has 6 single-user restrooms for a semiprivate bathroom. Tucker Hall is also home to the Betty Parke Tucker Center for Neurodiversity, which is home to AU’s Pathways Program for college-capable students with autism spectrum disorder.
 Dunham Hall: Includes the university bookstore, Dunham School of Business, and classrooms.
 Eckhart Hall: Includes central administration functions, classroom space and Lowry Chapel. Along with Davis Hall and Wilkinson Hall, Eckhart was one of the three original buildings of Aurora College.
 Ellsworth and Virginia Hill Welcome Center and Schingoethe Center: The Center serves as a gathering place for campus and community functions. It features a small library, dining room, and Ethel Tapper Recital Hall, an 80-seat performance space. It is also home to the Schingoethe Center Museum.
 The Institute for Collaboration: Includes classrooms, the Caterpillar Center for Teaching and Learning, and the 500-seat Crimi Auditorium, which includes a pipe organ that was dedicated in 2010. The Institute also houses the Scott Center for Online and Graduate Studies, which opened in 2023.
 Jenks Hall: Built in 1957, Jenks Hall is a residence hall for freshmen and upperclassmen, and also includes the university fitness center and wellness center.
 John C. Dunham Hall: Formerly the STEM Partnership School, John C. Dunham Hall includes classrooms, study spaces and updated labs for the School of Health and Sciences. The building was awarded Leadership in Energy Environmental Design (LEED) Platinum Certification by the U.S. Green Building Council.
 Kimberly and James Hill Center for Student Success: The Hill Center includes study spaces, a large classroom, and the Career Services department.
 Parolini Music Center: Named for alumni and supporters Roger and Marilyn Parolini, the facility includes a music ensemble room, art studio, two teaching studios and music practice rooms.
 Phillips Library: Built in 1962, the library's collection includes more than 99,000 books and 7,000 multimedia materials. The building includes a computer lab, the Center for Teaching & Learning and study rooms.
 Stephens Hall: Houses the Fox River Valley Center for Community Enrichment, Perry Theatre, and the “Spartan Spot” student commons area.
 Wackerlin Center for Faith and Action: Located in a restored modern home designed by the architecture firm Keck and Keck, the Wackerlin Center is the hub for campus ministries, community service and leadership studies.
 Watkins Hall: Watkins Hall houses freshmen and upperclassmen in air-conditioned double rooms and suites. The building is co-ed by wing, with same-gender, community-style bathrooms located on each floor.
 Wilkinson Hall: One of the original residence halls on campus, Wilkinson Hall was built in 1912 and houses upperclassmen.

George Williams College of Aurora University is located on the shores of Geneva Lake in Williams Bay, Wisconsin and includes 137.5 acres of property.

Buildings include:
 Beasley Campus Center: Originally built in 1980 and named for the Beasley family, the center was expanded in 1996 and remodeled in 2007. It currently houses the campus dining facilities, space for concerts, banquets and receptions. Housed within the building are the Elliot Frank Activities Center and the Sir George Williams Room, a replica of YMCA founder Sir George Williams' room in London where he held meetings.
 Brandenburg Hall: Designed by Emery Stanford Hall and built in 1916 this building includes offices for Music by the Lake, a summer concert series held annually. It is named after former GWC trustee and Associate General Secretary of the YMCA National Council, Earl Brandenburg.
 Coffman Residence Hall: Named for past GWC president Harold Coffman, this building was built in 1960 and includes single rooms for student housing.
 Emery Residence Hall: Built in 1998 and named after the Emery family, this student housing includes double and triple rooms and large gathering spaces.
 Ferro Pavilion: Home to summer music series Music by the Lake, the permanent outdoor facility was built in 2008 and named in honor of lake residents Michael and Jacky Ferro in recognition of their generous leadership gift. Presented by George Williams College of Aurora University, Music by the Lake is an outdoor entertainment series that features big band, classical, musical theater, family shows, opera and classic rock concerts throughout the summer months. The Ferro Pavilion provides concertgoers an up-close open-air performance experience complete with views of the lake. On select nights guests can also pack a picnic and enjoy the music on the open-seating lawn areas.
 Hamlin Welcome Center: The welcome center is home to the Office of Admission where representatives greet prospective students. It is named in honor of former GWC president Richard E. Hamlin.
 Ingalls Children's Building: Designed by Emery Stanford Hall and erected in 1926, it was built in memory of Ruth Ann Ingalls.
 Lewis Hall: Designed by Emery Stanford Hall, a contemporary of Frank Lloyd Wright, the building was constructed in 1898 as a dining hall and named for YMCA secretary William Lewis. Today it houses the newly redesigned College Inn, an a la carte restaurant for students and the public open year-round and a space for student activities. The building also includes a college gift shop.
 Lowrey Hall: Named in honor of Lucy Eva Lowrey, this building provides year-round space for groups.
 Mabel Cratty: A 1926 gift to the campus from the national YWCA the Mabel Cratty Building was designed by Emery Stanford Hall and created as a place for reading and contemplation. Named for the YWCA secretary, the building was renovated in 2012, an effort which was celebrated by the Wisconsin chapter of the American Institute of Architects with an Award of Merit. Inside Mabel Cratty, is Duncan Hall, named in honor of retired GWC Senior Vice President Bill Duncan and wife Laverne. Today it serves as a gathering space for the campus and lake communities.
 Meyer Hall: Named for former trustee Frank Meyer Jr., this hall was built in 1957 and renovated in 2007. It is home to faculty offices and a learning center.
 Oak and Hickory Residence Halls: Completed in 2003, these two adjacent buildings are used for student housing and include double and triple rooms.
 Weidensall Administration Building: Named for Robert Weidensall, one of three founders of the campus, the building was constructed in 1910 and designed by Emery Stanford Hall. The Conference Center, which organizes campus space for business meetings, social gatherings or over-night retreats, is also located in this building.
 Winston Paul Educational Center: Built with funds from the Winston Paul trusts and dedicated in 2004, the Educational Center is the main academic building on campus with classrooms, computer lab and meeting rooms.

Schingoethe Center of Aurora University 
Aurora University is home to the Schingoethe Center of Aurora University, a museum best known for its collection of Native American artifacts. The museum was founded when Herbert and Martha Schingoethe commissioned the building of Dunham Hall, which opened to the public in 1990 and which housed their donated collection of 6000 artifacts.

In 2015, the museum relocated to the newly constructed Ellsworth and Virginia Hill Welcome Center. The Schingoethe Center was named as a Smithsonian affiliate in 2017.

Athletics

The Aurora athletic teams are called the Spartans. The university is a member of the Division III level of the National Collegiate Athletic Association (NCAA), primarily competing in the Northern Athletics Collegiate Conference (NACC; formerly known as the Northern Athletics Conference (NAC) until after the 2012–13 school year) since the 2006–07 academic year; while its men's lacrosse team competes in the Midwest Lacrosse Conference (MLC), and its women's bowling team competing in the Central Intercollegiate Bowling Conference (CIBC). The Spartans previously competing in the D-III Northern Illinois-Iowa Conference (NIIC) from 1995–96 to 2005–06; and in the Chicagoland Collegiate Athletic Conference (CCAC) of the National Association of Intercollegiate Athletics (NAIA) as an associate member from 1954–55 to 1959–60.

Aurora competes in 22 intercollegiate varsity sports: Men's sports include baseball, basketball, cross country, football, golf, ice hockey, lacrosse, soccer, track & field, volleyball and wrestling; while women's sports include basketball, bowling, cross country, golf, ice hockey, lacrosse, soccer, softball, track & field, volleyball and wrestling. Club sports include women's cheer and dance, men's ice hockey (ACHA D2 & D3) and women's ice hockey (ACHA D1). Approximately 40 percent of the student population participates in intercollegiate sports.

Facilities
The primary athletics facilities are Thornton Gymnasium, located in Alumni Hall, and Vago Field, which serves as the football, soccer and lacrosse field. The Vago Field grandstand seats 600 people.

Championships

Aurora University athletic teams have captured 123 conference championships in school history. Since joining the NCAA in 1982, AU men's and women's teams have won 103 conference championships and appeared in 59 NCAA tournaments.

Men's sports
 Baseball:
 Conference Championships (24) — 2021 | 2012 | 2006 | 2005 | 2002 | 2001 | 2000 | 1999 | 1998 | 1997 | 1995 | 1994 | 1993 | 1992 | 1991 | 1990 | 1989 | 1988 | 1987 | 1986 | 1985 | 1984 | 1978 | 1974 
 NCAA Appearances (20) — 2012 | 2011 | 2010 | 2006 | 2005 | 2004 | 2002 | 2000 | 1999 | 1998 | 1997 | 1996 | 1995 | 1994 | 1993 | 1992 | 1991 | 1990 | 1989 | 1987
 Basketball:
 Conference Championships (22) — 2018–19 | 2017–18 | 2012–13 | 2009–10 | 2008–09 | 2007–08 | 2006–07 | 2004–05 | 2003–04 | 1997–98 | 1996–97 | 1993–94 | 1988–89 | 1987–88 | 1985–86 | 1984–85 | 1983–84 | 1982–83 | 1979–80 | 1972–73 | 1971–72 | 1970–71 
 NCAA Appearances (9) — 2012-13 | 2009–2010 | 2008–09 | 2007–08 | 2006–07 | 2004–05 | 2002–03 | 2000–01 | 1997–98
 Cross Country:
 Conference Championships (7) — 2020 | 2017 | 2016 | 2015 | 2013 | 2012 | 2006
 Football:
 Co-Conference Champions (1) — 2016 | 2020 (Spring)
 Conference Championships (5) — 2021 | 2019 | 2008 | 2004 | 2000 | 1999 | 1998
 NCAA Appearances (4) — 2021 | 2019 | 2008 | 2004 | 2000 | 1992
 Golf:
 Conference Championships (6) — 2009 | 2006 | 1992 | 1990 | 1984 | 1974
 NCAA Appearances (1) — 2009–10
 Lacrosse:
 Conference Champions (4) — 2016 | 2015 | 2014 | 2013
 NCAA Tournament Appearances (4) — 2016 | 2015 | 2014 | 2013
 NCAA Tournament Sweet Sixteens (4) — 2016 | 2015 | 2014 | 2013
 Soccer:
 Conference Championships (13) — 2019 | 2004 | 1997 | 1990 | 1985 | 1979 | 1978 | 1977 | 1976 | 1975 | 1973 | 1971 | 1970
 NCAA Appearances (1) — 2006
 Tennis:
 Conference Championships (5) — 2000 | 1996 | 1995 | 1994 | 1981
 Track and Field (Indoor and Outdoor):
 Outdoor: Conference Championships (1) — 2006
 Indoor: Conference Championships (2) — 2013 | 2007

Women's sports
 Basketball:
 Conference Championships (8) — 2002–03 | 2001–02 | 2000–01 | 1995–96 | 1994–95 | 1993–94 | 1992–93 | 1988–89
 NCAA Appearances (4) — 2003–04 | 2001–02 | 1994–95 | 1993–94
 Cross Country:
 Conference Championships (5) — 2013 | 2012 | 2008 | 2006 | 2005
 Golf:
 Conference Championships (3) — 2008 | 2007 | 2006
 Soccer:
 Conference Championships (14) — 2012 | 2011 | 2010 | 2009 | 2008 | 2007 | 2006 | 2005 | 2003 | 2002 | 2000 | 1999 | 1997 | 1996
 NCAA Appearances (8) — 2011 | 2010 | 2009 | 2007 | 2006 | 2005 | 2002 | 2001
 Softball:
 Conference Championships (20) — 2013 | 2009 | 2008 | 2007 | 2006 | 2005 | 2004 | 1997 | 1993 | 1991 | 1990 | 1989 | 1986 | 1985 | 1983 | 1982 | 1981 | 1980 | 1979 | 1978
 NCAA Appearances (15) — 2013 | 2010 | 2008 | 2006 | 2005 | 1995 | 1994 | 1993 | 1992 | 1991 | 1990 | 1988 | 1986 | 1985 | 1982
 Tennis:
 Conference Championships (3) — 1995 | 1994 | 1981
 Track and Field (Indoor and Outdoor):
 Outdoor: Conference Championships (7) — 2017 | 2016 | 2015 | 2014 | 2013 | 2012 | 2006
 Indoor: Conference Championships (5) — 2016 | 2015 | 2014 | 2013 | 2011
 Volleyball:
 Conference Championships (4) — 2018 | 2006 | 1996 | 1977

Notable Alumni

 Donald Kieso Donald and Donna Kieso

References

External links
 
 Official athletics website

 
Private universities and colleges in Wisconsin
Educational institutions established in 1893
Education in Aurora, Illinois
Education in McHenry County, Illinois
Education in Walworth County, Wisconsin
Universities and colleges founded by the YMCA
National Register of Historic Places in Kane County, Illinois
1893 establishments in Illinois
University and college buildings on the National Register of Historic Places in Illinois
Education in Kane County, Illinois
Private universities and colleges in Illinois